Hornig is a surname. Notable people with the surname include:

Carola Hornig (born 1962), German rower
Charles Hornig (1916–1999), one of the earliest contributors to the science fiction genre
Donald Hornig (1920–2013), American chemist, explosives expert, teacher and presidential science advisor
Ernst Hornig (1894–1976), German Bishop of the Evangelical Church of Silesia
Florian Hörnig (born 1986), German footballer
Heinz Hornig (born 1937), former German football player
Irina Hornig, skydiver who competed for the SC Dynamo Hoppegarten/ Sportvereinigung (SV) Dynamo
Joan Hornig, American jewelry designer
Johannes Hörnig (1921–2001), East German politician
Károly Hornig (1840–1917), Austrian-Hungarian Cardinal of the Roman Catholic Church
Lilli Hornig (1921–2017), American chemist involved in the Manhattan Project, and feminist
Mady Hornig, MD (born 1957), psychiatrist, associate professor of epidemiology at Columbia University's Mailman School of Public Health
Manuel Hornig (born 1982), German football player
Rudi Hornig (1938–2014), German boxer
Sabine Hornig (born 1964), German visual artist and photographer who lives and works in Berlin

See also
Honig
Hornick (disambiguation)
Hornigi
Hornik
Horniki
Horning